

About the Award
The President's Award is presented to a corporation or an executive who has made a commitment to promote diversity and advancement of minorities in the community.

References

 NAACP Theatre Awards

African-American theatre
NAACP Theatre Awards
Awards established in 1991
1991 establishments in the United States